Piyada Inthavong (born on 13 November 1992), better known by the names Lingling, Lingling Piyadar , Ling Piyada or Nong is a Lao transgender model.

Biography 
Born male to an upper-middle-class family in Champasak Province, Laos, where her parents are doctors, and the oldest of 4 children, Piyada had always felt like a girl when she was young. When she became a teenager, she "was embarrassed to dress as a man". After a trip to Thailand where she saw how beautiful transgender girls were, Piyada decided to transition to become a girl and sought the blessings of her conservative father to undergo a full sex change. She completed her sex reassignment surgery in Thailand at the age of 19.

Piyada has said that surgery has made her more confident "wearing tight pants" and as a woman.

After her transition, Piyada went to Thailand to seek opportunities and kick start her modeling career as she has long held aspirations to become a model.

Miss International Queen 2014 
During a promotional event for the 2014 edition of the Miss International Queen transgender beauty pageant, Piyada shot to prominence when she posted a picture of herself with famous Thai transgender actress and model Poyd Treechada on her Instagram account. Her stunning beauty and complexion led to direct comparisons between herself and Poyd, and as a representative of Laos she was a hot favourite to win the title in the pageant.

Subsequently, Piyada came in as a second runner-up. The Miss International Queen 2014 crown was won by Isabella Santiago of Venezuela.

The Casting Project Thailand Season 2 2015

Piyada is currently a contestant in Season 2 of The Casting Project (สงครามนางงาม) Thailand.

References

External links 
 

1992 births
Transgender female models
Living people
Laotian models
Laotian LGBT people
Miss International Queen contestants